Bourquin is a surname.

Notable people with the surname include:

Betty Bourquin, Swiss curler and coach
Corinne Bourquin, Swiss curler and coach
Christian Bourquin (1954–2014), French politician
George M. Bourquin (1863–1958), American judge
Hans Bourquin (1914–1998), Swiss rowing coxswain
Marie-Thérèse Bourquin (1916–2018), Belgian lawyer and the first female member of the Belgian Council of State
Martial Bourquin (born 1952), member of the Senate of France